p-Toluic acid (4-methylbenzoic acid) is a substituted benzoic acid with the formula CH3C6H4CO2H.   It is a white solid that is poorly soluble in water but soluble in acetone. A laboratory route to p-toluic acid involves oxidation of p-cymene with nitric acid.

Role in production of terephthalic acid
p-Toluic acid is an intermediate in the conversion of p-xylene to terephthalic acid, a commodity chemical used in the manufacture of polyethylene terephthalate. It is generated both by the oxidation of p-xylene as well as the hydrogenolysis of 4-carboxybenzaldehyde.  In related processes it is converted to methyl p-toluate, which is oxidized to monomethyl terephthalate.

See also 
 o-Toluic acid
 m-Toluic acid

References 

Benzoic acids

External links
Material Safety Data Sheet